Gertrude Claire (July 16, 1852 – April 28, 1928) was an actress of the American stage and Hollywood silent motion pictures.

Biography
Claire was born in Chicago, Illinois, and began appearing onstage at the age of 16. She played minor roles in New York City. In the coming years she began to play leads. Among the actors of note she played with John Drew Jr., Edwin Booth, and Richard Mansfield.

She began work in films while the industry was still based in New York. Then she moved to Hollywood, where she was part of the first motion picture playing company organized there. Claire had roles in 123 films beginning in 1910 and continuing until 1928. Her last appearance in movies was in the Clara Bow feature film Red Hair (1928).

On April 28, 1928, Claire died at her home in Hollywood, aged 76. Her funeral was conducted in the chapel of Hollywood Forever Cemetery. She was interred at Hollywood Forever Cemetery in Los Angeles, California.

Selected filmography

 The Two Brothers (1910)
 Ramona (1910)
 The Battle of Gettysburg (1913)
 The Aryan (1915)
 The Apostle of Vengeance (1916)
 Peggy (1916)
 The Crab (1917)
 Wooden Shoes (1917)
 Madcap Madge (1917)
 The Mother Instinct (1917)
 Happiness (1917)
 'Blue Blazes' Rawden (1918)
 When Do We Eat? (1918)
 Hard Boiled (1919)
 Little Comrade (1919)
 The Petal on the Current (1919)
 Stepping Out (1919)
 Widow by Proxy (1919)
 Jinx (1919)
 Blind Man's Eyes (1919)
 Romance and Arabella (1919)
 Dollar for Dollar (1920)
 The Cradle of Courage (1920)
 Her Beloved Villain (1920)
 The Money Changers (1920)
 The Forbidden Thing (1920)
 Madame Peacock (1920)
 Greater Than Love (1921)
 The Sin of Martha Queed (1921)
 The Fox (1921)
 The Invisible Power (1921)
 Hail the Woman (1921)
 Society Secrets (1921)
 The Adventures of Robinson Crusoe (1922)
 Forget Me Not (1922)
 Human Hearts (1922)
 Oliver Twist (1922)
 Environment (1922)
 The Super-Sex (1922)
 Ridin' Wild (1922)
 Double Dealing (1923)
 Itching Palms (1923)
 Ladies to Board (1924)
 The Heart Bandit (1924)
 Daughters of Today (1924)
 Wine of Youth (1924)
 The Wedding Song (1925)
 His Majesty, Bunker Bean (1925)
 Tumbleweeds (1925)
 Her Sister from Paris (1925)
 Romance Road (1925)
 The Little Irish Girl (1926)

References

Los Angeles Times, Actress' Funeral Arranged, April 29, 1928, Page F8.

External links

1852 births
1928 deaths
19th-century American actresses
American stage actresses
20th-century American actresses
American silent film actresses
Actresses from Chicago
Burials at Hollywood Forever Cemetery